Roelof Benjamin van den Bosch (1810–1862) was a Dutch botanist known for studying ferns and mosses.

Works 
 Bryologia Javanica seu descriptio muscorum frondosorum Archipelagi Indici iconibus illustrata - auctoribus F. Dozy et J. H. Molkenboer. Post mortem auctorum edentibus R. B. van den Bosch et C. M. van den Sande Lacoste - E. J. Brill in Lugduni-Batavorum - Leiden, 1855-1870 Downloadable on Biblioteca Digital
 Prodromus florae batavae - Editio altera. Nieuwe lijst der Nederlandsche phanerogamen en vaatkryptogamen. Uitgegeven door de Nederlandsche Botanische Vereniging. Nijmegen, F.E. Macdonald, 1901-1916
 Plantae Junghuhnianae - Leiden, 1856
 Hymenophyllaceae Javanicae, sive Descriptio hymenophyllacearum archipelagi Indici iconibus illustrata - Leiden, 1861

Eponyms 
  Vandenboschia in the family Hymenophyllaceae.

References 

1810 births
1862 deaths
19th-century Dutch botanists
Dutch pteridologists
Dutch bryologists
Scientists from Rotterdam